Khalid Boulahrouz (born 28 December 1981) is a Dutch former professional footballer who played as a defender. His nickname is "The Cannibal" for his ability to "eat up" the opposition. He was noted for his tackling and versatility at the back.

He played top-flight football in the Netherlands, Germany, England, Spain, Portugal and Denmark. A full international from 2004 to 2012, he earned 35 caps and was included in the Dutch squads for two World Cups and two European Championships.

Personal life
Boulahrouz was born in Maassluis, Netherlands to a family of Moroccan descent. He has eight siblings. As a youngster he went to the youth academies of Ajax and Haarlem. When he was sixteen his father died and he had to take responsibility for his family.

In December 2006, he married Sabia Thele. While Boulahrouz was in Switzerland preparing for the Euro 2008 quarter finals against Russia, his then wife Sabia gave birth to a prematurely born daughter Anissa who died in a Lausanne hospital. He opted to play against Russia a few days later, during which the Dutch team wore black armbands in his daughter's memory. The couple has a second daughter, Amaya (born March 2010) and a son, Daamin (born 30 January 2011). In January 2013 the couple announced their separation.

Club career
In his youth Boulahrouz played consecutively for Excelsior Maassluis, DSOV, Ajax, Haarlem and AZ.

RKC Waalwijk
After a difficult period playing for different clubs, he finally found some stability at Waalwijk, where coach Martin Jol gave him the confidence he had been looking for. He began his professional career in the Dutch Eredivisie for RKC on 9 March 2002, against Heerenveen.

Hamburger SV
After playing two seasons for RKC he moved to Hamburg to play in the German Bundesliga at the start of the 2004–05 season. While at Hamburg, he earned his nickname "Khalid der Kannibale" ("Khalid the Cannibal") for his ability to eat up the opposition. This is illustrated by the number of cards he received – 16 yellows and three reds in two seasons at the club. He was also part of a defence that conceded the fewest goals in the 2005–06 Bundesliga season: 30 goals in 34 games.

Chelsea

On 18 August 2006, Chelsea agreed a fee with Hamburg to sign Boulahrouz. The fee was thought to be around £8.5 million (€12 million). After Chelsea's opening game of the 2006–07 season, manager José Mourinho confirmed that the club had signed Boulahrouz but were waiting for his international clearance to be finalised, before speaking of the potential roles Boulahrouz would have in the side. Mourinho stated "in a short squad and in a country where you can have only 16 players for a match, it’s important to have cover for many positions." On 21 August 2006, Chelsea completed the signing of Boulahrouz. Six days later, he made his Premiership début against Blackburn Rovers. He wore the number 9 shirt, previously occupied by Hernán Crespo – this is an unconventional number for a defender, being traditionally associated with strikers, but was given to him just because it happened to be one of the numbers not currently allocated to a player by Chelsea at the time of signing.

Boulahrouz made a promising start to his Chelsea career, featuring prominently in high-profile games against Liverpool and Barcelona. However, Boulahrouz gradually dropped out of favour. Boulahrouz was out for a lengthy period of time after a knee injury, followed by a shoulder injury while playing in an FA Cup tie against Norwich City. Boulahrouz eventually dropped out of contention as the season wound down, with John Terry and Ricardo Carvalho as the first-choice defensive pairing. When Carvalho was injured, manager Mourinho paired Terry with Ghanaian midfielder Michael Essien.

Sevilla (loan)
Boulahrouz joined Spanish club Sevilla on a year-long loan for the 2007–08 season. However, he played just six games for them and was deemed surplus to requirements. He returned to Chelsea in 2008 but was not given a squad number and made no appearances.

VfB Stuttgart
On 21 July 2008, Boulahrouz moved to VfB Stuttgart for a fee of around €5 million. He struggled in his first three seasons. Early in the 2011–12 Bundesliga season, however, Khalid became a regular in the starting line-up. The 29-year-old defender had his 100th cap in the top German league on 17 September 2011 at SC Freiburg. Two weeks later, Boulahrouz scored his first goal (only his second in the Bundesliga) for Stuttgart on 30 September 2011. His goal came in the 69th minute of a 2–0 win over 1. FC Kaiserslautern.

In May 2012 VfB Stuttgart announced that his expiring contract would not be extended.

Sporting CP
On 18 July 2012, Boulahrouz signed a two-year contract with Sporting Clube de Portugal. He made 11 league appearances for the club, and on 3 September 2013 his contract was terminated.

Brøndby IF
On 7 October 2013, Boulahrouz signed a contract which is due until the summer 2014. The transfer was confirmed after many weeks of negotiating. He made 13 league appearances for Brøndby IF that season. Boulahrouz had quite a lot of injuries during his stay at Brøndby, which was one of the reasons why a new contract was not discussed.

Feyenoord
On 14 July 2014, it was officially announced that Boulahrouz had signed a one-year contract with Feyenoord on a free transfer. He was one of the replacements for outgoing defenders Stefan de Vrij, Daryl Janmaat and Bruno Martins Indi after their performances for the Netherlands at the 2014 FIFA World Cup. On 11 February 2016, more than half a year after his contract with Feyenoord had expired, Boulahrouz announced his retirement from professional football.

International career

Boulahrouz' displays for RKC caused Marco van Basten to pick him for the Netherlands national football team. He made his international début on 3 September 2004 in a 3–0 win for the Netherlands against Liechtenstein, and was named in the squad for the 2006 World Cup. He managed 34 caps for the national team, as of November 2011.

Boulahrouz was sent off from the Netherlands match against Portugal in the 2006 FIFA World Cup Round of Sixteen after a second bookable offence. He was judged to have used an elbow on Portugal's Luís Figo. Before that, he was first booked in the seventh minute after a violent tackle that injured Cristiano Ronaldo, eventually forcing the substitution of the Portuguese player. Referee Valentin Ivanov issued a total of 16 yellow cards and four red cards in this match, a World Cup record.

Having initially missed the cut for the Dutch Euro 2008 squad, following an injury to Liverpool's Ryan Babel, he was reinstated to the 23-man squad. He was chosen to start in the group games.

2010 FIFA World Cup
Boulahrouz was included in the preliminary squad for the 2010 FIFA World Cup in South Africa. On 27 May 2010, coach Bert van Marwijk announced that Boulahrouz would be part of the final 23-man squad. Boulahrouz started in the Netherlands' last group match on 24 June, a 2–1 win over Cameroon, in place of Gregory van der Wiel. He also played in the semi-final match against Uruguay.

Style of play
Goalkeeper and international teammate Edwin van der Sar said of Boulahrouz "He is an important defender, but he is also the man to lift spirits within the squad. He is the sort of guy you need around during long evenings at training camp." Former Dutch centre-back Jaap Stam said that Boulahrouz could become his successor.

Coaching career
In early 2021, Boulahrouz returned to his boyhood club AZ, joining as an assistant coach for the Under-18 team; in September 2021 he successively signed a two-year contract with the club as an assistant and defensive coach for the senior team, a role he left by the end of the 2021–22 season.

Career statistics

Club

International

Honours
Hamburger SV
UEFA Intertoto Cup: 2005

Netherlands
FIFA World Cup runner-up: 2010

References

External links

 Continued dialogue with Khalid Boulahrouz
 
 
 
 Interview with Boulahrouz 
 Official Danish Superliga stats 
 
 Premier League Profile

1981 births
Living people
Footballers from Maassluis
2006 FIFA World Cup players
2010 FIFA World Cup players
Association football central defenders
Brøndby IF players
Bundesliga players
Chelsea F.C. players
Danish Superliga players
Dutch expatriate footballers
Dutch expatriate sportspeople in Germany
Dutch expatriate sportspeople in England
Dutch expatriate sportspeople in Portugal
Dutch expatriate sportspeople in Spain
Dutch expatriate sportspeople in Denmark
Dutch people of Riffian descent
Dutch footballers
Dutch people of Moroccan-Berber descent
Eredivisie players
Excelsior Maassluis players
Expatriate men's footballers in Denmark
Expatriate footballers in England
Expatriate footballers in Germany
Expatriate footballers in Portugal
Expatriate footballers in Spain
Feyenoord players
Hamburger SV players
La Liga players
Netherlands international footballers
Premier League players
RKC Waalwijk players
Sevilla FC players
Sporting CP footballers
UEFA Euro 2008 players
UEFA Euro 2012 players
VfB Stuttgart players